Gandasoli Station (GDS) is a class III railway station located at Cipurut, Cireunghas, Sukabumi Regency, West Java, Indonesia. The station, which is located at an altitude of +580 m, is included in the Operation Area II Bandung. This station only has two railway tracks with track 2 as a straight line and still uses a mechanical signaling system.

Services 
The following is a list of train services at the Gandasoli Station.

Passenger services
 Economy class

References

External links

Sukabumi Regency
Railway stations in West Java
Railway stations opened in 1883